Yuraq Qaqa (Quechua yuraq white, qaqa rock, "white rock", also spelled Yuraj Khakha) is a mountain in the Bolivian Andes which reaches a height of approximately . It is located in the Cochabamba Department, Tapacari Province. Yuraq Qaqa lies northwest of Llust'a Q'asa and southeast of Warawarani.

References

See also
 List of mountains in the Andes

Mountains of Cochabamba Department